Agenville is a commune in the Somme department in Hauts-de-France in northern France.

Geography
It is surrounded by the communes  Domléger-Longvillers, Conteville and Prouville.

History
Destroyed by the English at the time of the battle of Crecy in 1346 and rebuilt on a new site.
Rebuilt after the bombardments of 1944, when 95% of the village was destroyed, as the V1 rocket site was nearby.
Agenville was once a centre of a pilgrimage.

Population

See also
 Communes of the Somme department

References

External links

 An Agenville website

Communes of Somme (department)